Ellice was launched in 1824 in Sunderland as a West Indiaman. 

Lloyd's List reported on 24 July 1829 that Ellice, Whitmore, master, was missing since 28 April 1829.

Citations

1824 ships
Age of Sail merchant ships of England
Maritime incidents in 1829